Paano ang Pangako? (formerly titled as Paano ang Pasko?) is a 2020 Philippine television drama series broadcast on TV5. Directed by Enrico Quizon, Ricky Davao, and Perci Intalan, it features an ensemble cast including Maricel Laxa, Ricky Davao, Allan Paule, Bing Loyzaga, Beauty Gonzalez, Julia Clarete, Ejay Falcon, Devon Seron, John Lapus, Elijah Canlas, and Miles Ocampo. It premiered on November 23, 2020, as Paano ang Pasko?. In 2021, following the end of the Christmas season, the show was renamed Paano ang Pangako?.

Following the end of some blocktimer series, and to give way to the simulcast of ABS-CBN's Primetime Bida, the timeslot of Paano ang Pangako? was changed from 9:00 pm to 7:15 pm, and its running time was extended from 30 minutes to 45 minutes.

Paano ang Pangako? had a 5-hour special finale marathon on April 3, 2021 (Black Saturday), from 2:00 pm to 7:00 pm on TV5 and was replaced by Niña Niño.

Plot

Season 1 (Paano ang Pasko?)
The Aguinaldos have planned out to a sincere spirit of christmas despite the pandemic began their lives  as part together, in the cohersive shocks to their family.

Season 2 (Paano ang Pangako?) 
The secrets and scandals in the Aguinaldo family, led by matriarch Faith, get more complicated as a new family threatens to upend their lives.
The arrival of the Dominante-Cruz family helmed by its matriarch Elvira, takes an interesting twist as she vows to strip the Aguinaldo’s of their everything – wealth, honor, and heir.

Cast and characters

Main
 Maricel Laxa as Faith Aguinaldo
 Ricky Davao as Joselito "Jose" Quinto †
 Allan Paule as Antonio "Anton" Aguinaldo †
 Bing Loyzaga as Doña Elvira Dominante-Cruz †
 Beauty Gonzalez as Hope Aguinaldo
 Julia Clarete as Love Aguinaldo-Robles †
 Devon Seron as Joy Aguinaldo
 Elijah Canlas as Noel Aguinaldo
 Ejay Falcon as Carl Robles
 John Lapus as Manang Kitty / Paquito
 Karel Marquez as Karen Dominante-Cruz
 Miles Ocampo as Isabel
 Matt Evans as Eric
 Danita Paner / Adrianna So as Andi
 Ahron Villena as Luis
 Cedrick Juan as Alex
 Kyle Velino as Drake
 Justine Buenaflor as Mylene 
 Ace Ismael as Dean

Supporting
 Desiree del Valle as Natalie Wilson 
 Mel Martinez as Tamisha
 Ayeesha Cervantes as Trisha
 Gilleth Sandico as Jessica
 Zandra Summer as Samantha
 Bobby Andrews as Richard Dominante-Cruz †  
 Ramon Christopher as Fernan Dominante-Cruz †

 Patricia Ismael as Carrie †

See also 
 List of programs broadcast by TV5 (Philippine TV network)

References

2020 Philippine television series debuts
2021 Philippine television series endings
TV5 (Philippine TV network) drama series
Filipino-language television shows
Television shows about the COVID-19 pandemic
Philippine drama television series